Teatro Sociale may refer to:

 Teatro Sociale, Como, a theatre in Como, Italy
 Teatro Sociale (Treviso), a theatre in Treviso, Italy
 Teatro Sociale (Bergamo), a theatre in Bergamo, Italy